The 1979–80 Philadelphia Flyers season was the Philadelphia Flyers' 13th season in the National Hockey League (NHL). This team owns the longest unbeaten streak in North American sports history in 35 consecutive games without a loss, from October 14 to January 6. The Flyers reached the Stanley Cup Finals but lost in six games to the New York Islanders.

Off-season
On August 10, 1979, Bobby Clarke was named a player-assistant coach. In order to become an assistant coach, Clarke was required to give up the captaincy due to NHL rules. Mel Bridgman was named Clarke's replacement as team captain on October 11.

Regular season
The Flyers went undefeated for a North American professional sports record 35 straight games (25–0–10), a record that still stands to this day. In doing so, the Flyers wrapped up the Patrick Division title with 14 games to spare and the #1 overall seed in the playoffs.

Season standings

Playoffs
The Flyers' regular-season success continued into the playoffs, as the Flyers swept a young Wayne Gretzky and his Edmonton Oilers in the first round, then went on to get revenge against Fred Shero and his Rangers by beating them in five before disposing of Minnesota in five to lock up a berth in the Stanley Cup Finals. Facing the Islanders for the Cup, the Flyers would ultimately lose in six games on Bob Nystrom's overtime Cup-winning goal. The result of the series was marred by controversy, as the Islanders were arguably offside on the play that resulted in their second goal in Game 6, but no call was made. Linesman Leon Stickle admitted after the game that he had blown the call.

Schedule and results

Regular season

|- style="background:#cfc;"
| 1 || October 11 || NY Islanders || 2–5 || Philadelphia || Myre || 17,077 || 1–0–0 || 2 || 
|- style="background:#fcf;"
| 2 || October 13 || Philadelphia  || 2–9 || Atlanta || Myre || 13,358 || 1–1–0 || 2 || 
|- style="background:#cfc;"
| 3 || October 14 || Toronto || 3–4 || Philadelphia || Peeters || 17,077 || 2–1–0 || 4 || 
|- style="background:#cfc;"
| 4 || October 18 || Atlanta || 2–6 || Philadelphia || Peeters || 17,077 || 3–1–0 || 6 || 
|- style="background:#cfc;"
| 5 || October 20 || Philadelphia || 7–3 || Detroit || Myre || 15,417 || 4–1–0 || 8 || 
|- style="background:#ffc;"
| 6 || October 21 || Montreal || 6–6 || Philadelphia || Myre || 17,077 || 4–1–1 || 9 || 
|- style="background:#cfc;"
| 7 || October 25 || NY Rangers || 2–5 || Philadelphia || Peeters || 17,077 || 5–1–1 || 11 || 
|- style="background:#cfc;"
| 8 || October 28 || Detroit || 4–5 || Philadelphia || Myre || 17,077 || 6–1–1 || 13 || 
|-

|- style="background:#cfc;"
| 9 || November 1 || St. Louis || 1–3 || Philadelphia || Peeters || 17,077 || 7–1–1 || 15 || 
|- style="background:#cfc;"
| 10 || November 3 || Philadelphia || 5–3 || Montreal || Myre || 17,012 || 8–1–1 || 17 || 
|- style="background:#cfc;"
| 11 || November 4 || Buffalo || 1–3 || Philadelphia || Peeters || 17,077 || 9–1–1 || 19 || 
|- style="background:#cfc;"
| 12 || November 7 || Philadelphia || 4–3 || Quebec || Myre || 11,899 || 10–1–1 || 21 || 
|- style="background:#cfc;"
| 13 || November 10 || Philadelphia || 5–2 || NY Islanders || Peeters || 14,995 || 11–1–1 || 23 || 
|- style="background:#cfc;"
| 14 || November 11 || Vancouver || 4–5 || Philadelphia || Myre || 17,077 || 12–1–1 || 25 || 
|- style="background:#cfc;"
| 15 || November 15 || Edmonton || 3–5 || Philadelphia || Myre || 17,077 || 13–1–1 || 27 || 
|- style="background:#ffc;"
| 16 || November 17 || Philadelphia || 3–3 || St. Louis || Peeters || 12,723 || 13–1–2 || 28 || 
|- style="background:#cfc;"
| 17 || November 21 || Philadelphia || 6–4 || Los Angeles || Peeters || 10,030 || 14–1–2 || 30 || 
|- style="background:#cfc;"
| 18 || November 23 || Philadelphia || 5–2 || Vancouver || Myre || 16,413 || 15–1–2 || 32 || 
|- style="background:#ffc;"
| 19 || November 24 || Philadelphia || 2–2 || Edmonton || Peeters || 15,423 || 15–1–3 || 33 || 
|- style="background:#cfc;"
| 20 || November 27 || Hartford || 2–6 || Philadelphia || Myre || 17,077 || 16–1–3 || 35 || 
|- style="background:#cfc;"
| 21 || November 29 || Minnesota || 4–6 || Philadelphia || Peeters || 17,077 || 17–1–3 || 37 || 
|-

|- style="background:#ffc;"
| 22 || December 1 || Philadelphia || 4–4 || Toronto || Myre || 16,485 || 17–1–4 || 38 || 
|- style="background:#ffc;"
| 23 || December 2 || Detroit || 4–4 || Philadelphia || Peeters || 17,077 || 17–1–5 || 39 || 
|- style="background:#ffc;"
| 24 || December 4 || Boston || 2–2 || Philadelphia || Myre || 17,077 || 17–1–6 || 40 || 
|- style="background:#cfc;"
| 25 || December 6 || Los Angeles || 4–9 || Philadelphia || Peeters || 17,077 || 18–1–6 || 42 || 
|- style="background:#ffc;"
| 26 || December 9 || Chicago || 4–4 || Philadelphia || Myre || 17,077 || 18–1–7 || 43 || 
|- style="background:#cfc;"
| 27 || December 13 || Quebec || 4–6 || Philadelphia || Peeters || 17,077 || 19–1–7 || 45 || 
|- style="background:#cfc;"
| 28 || December 15 || Buffalo || 2–3 || Philadelphia || Peeters || 17,077 || 20–1–7 || 47 || 
|- style="background:#ffc;"
| 29 || December 16 || Philadelphia || 1–1 || NY Rangers || Myre || 17,404 || 20–1–8 || 48 || 
|- style="background:#ffc;"
| 30 || December 20 || Pittsburgh || 1–1 || Philadelphia || Peeters || 17,077 || 20–1–9 || 49 || 
|- style="background:#cfc;"
| 31 || December 22 || Philadelphia || 5–2 || Boston || Myre || 14,673 || 21–1–9 || 51 || 
|- style="background:#cfc;"
| 32 || December 23 || Hartford || 2–4 || Philadelphia || Peeters || 17,077 || 22–1–9 || 53 || 
|- style="background:#ffc;"
| 33 || December 26 || Philadelphia || 4–4 || Hartford || Myre || 7,627 || 22–1–10 || 54 || 
|- style="background:#cfc;"
| 34 || December 28 || Philadelphia || 5–3 || Winnipeg || Peeters || 16,038 || 23–1–10 || 56 || 
|- style="background:#cfc;"
| 35 || December 29 || Philadelphia || 3–2 || Colorado || Myre || 16,452 || 24–1–10 || 58 || 
|-

|- style="background:#cfc;"
| 36 || January 4 || Philadelphia || 5–3 || NY Rangers || Myre || 17,398 || 25–1–10 || 60 || 
|- style="background:#cfc;"
| 37 || January 6 || Philadelphia || 4–2 || Buffalo || Peeters || 16,433 || 26–1–10 || 62 || 
|- style="background:#fcf;"
| 38 || January 7 || Philadelphia || 1–7 || Minnesota || Myre || 15,962 || 26–2–10 || 62 || 
|- style="background:#cfc;"
| 39 || January 10 || Winnipeg || 4–5 || Philadelphia || Peeters || 17,077 || 27–2–10 || 64 || 
|- style="background:#fcf;"
| 40 || January 12 || Philadelphia || 3–4 || Montreal || Myre || 18,091 || 27–3–10 || 64 || 
|- style="background:#ffc;"
| 41 || January 13 || St. Louis || 1–1 || Philadelphia || Peeters || 17,077 || 27–3–11 || 65 || 
|- style="background:#cfc;"
| 42 || January 15 || Washington || 4–7 || Philadelphia || Myre || 17,077 || 28–3–11 || 67 || 
|- style="background:#cfc;"
| 43 || January 17 || Chicago || 1–5 || Philadelphia || Peeters || 17,077 || 29–3–11 || 69 || 
|- style="background:#ffc;"
| 44 || January 19 || Philadelphia || 4–4 || Washington || Myre || 18,130 || 29–3–12 || 70 || 
|- style="background:#cfc;"
| 45 || January 22 || Philadelphia || 3–1 || St. Louis || Peeters || 17,453 || 30–3–12 || 72 || 
|- style="background:#cfc;"
| 46 || January 23 || Philadelphia || 4–1 || Chicago || Myre || 17,160 || 31–3–12 || 74 || 
|- style="background:#cfc;"
| 47 || January 25 || Philadelphia || 5–4 || Winnipeg || Peeters || 15,122 || 32–3–12 || 76 || 
|- style="background:#cfc;"
| 48 || January 27 || Philadelphia || 5–3 || Edmonton || Peeters || 15,423 || 33–3–12 || 78 || 
|- style="background:#cfc;"
| 49 || January 31 || Minnesota || 2–4 || Philadelphia || St. Croix || 17,077 || 34–3–12 || 80 || 
|-

|- style="background:#cfc;"
| 50 || February 2 || Philadelphia || 4–0 || Pittsburgh || Peeters || 16,033 || 35–3–12 || 82 || 
|- style="background:#ffc;"
| 51 || February 3 || Boston || 3–3 || Philadelphia || Myre || 17,077 || 35–3–13 || 83 || 
|- style="background:#fcf;"
| 52 || February 7 || Vancouver || 4–1 || Philadelphia || Myre || 17,077 || 35–4–13 || 83 || 
|- style="background:#cfc;"
| 53 || February 9 || Philadelphia || 6–5 || Detroit || Peeters || 19,353 || 36–4–13 || 85 || 
|- style="background:#cfc;"
| 54 || February 10 || Los Angeles || 2–5 || Philadelphia || Myre || 17,077 || 37–4–13 || 87 || 
|- style="background:#cfc;"
| 55 || February 14 || Winnipeg || 1–5 || Philadelphia || Peeters || 17,077 || 38–4–13 || 89 || 
|- style="background:#cfc;"
| 56 || February 17 || Pittsburgh || 5–6 || Philadelphia || Myre || 17,077 || 39–4–13 || 91 || 
|- style="background:#fcf;"
| 57 || February 19 || Philadelphia || 6–8 || Colorado || Peeters || 11,563 || 39–5–13 || 91 || 
|- style="background:#cfc;"
| 58 || February 22 || Philadelphia || 7–3 || Vancouver || Myre || 16,341 || 40–5–13 || 93 || 
|- style="background:#cfc;"
| 59 || February 23 || Philadelphia || 5–1 || Los Angeles || Peeters || 16,005 || 41–5–13 || 95 || 
|- style="background:#ffc;"
| 60 || February 27 || Philadelphia || 1–1 || Buffalo || Myre || 16,433 || 41–5–14 || 96 || 
|-

|- style="background:#ffc;"
| 61 || March 1 || Philadelphia || 3–3 || Toronto || Myre || 16,485 || 41–5–15 || 97 || 
|- style="background:#fcf;"
| 62 || March 2 || Montreal || 5–1 || Philadelphia || Peeters || 17,077 || 41–6–15 || 97 || 
|- style="background:#cfc;"
| 63 || March 4 || Colorado || 1–4 || Philadelphia || Peeters || 17,007 || 42–6–15 || 99 || 
|- style="background:#fcf;"
| 64 || March 6 || NY Islanders || 5–2 || Philadelphia || Myre || 17,077 || 42–7–15 || 99 || 
|- style="background:#cfc;"
| 65 || March 8 || Philadelphia || 6–2 || Minnesota || Peeters || 15,701 || 43–7–15 || 101 || 
|- style="background:#cfc;"
| 66 || March 9 || Edmonton || 3–5 || Philadelphia || Myre || 17,077 || 44–7–15 || 103 || 
|- style="background:#cfc;"
| 67 || March 11 || Philadelphia || 4–3 || Pittsburgh || Peeters || 9,972 || 45–7–15 || 105 || 
|- style="background:#ffc;"
| 68 || March 12 || Philadelphia || 6–6 || Chicago || Myre || 17,306 || 45–7–16 || 106 || 
|- style="background:#fcf;"
| 69 || March 15 || Philadelphia || 3–4 || Atlanta || Peeters || 15,156 || 45–8–16 || 106 || 
|- style="background:#ffc;"
| 70 || March 16 || Colorado || 4–4 || Philadelphia || Myre || 17,077 || 45–8–17 || 107 || 
|- style="background:#fcf;"
| 71 || March 20 || Toronto || 3–0 || Philadelphia || Peeters || 17,077 || 45–9–17 || 107 || 
|- style="background:#ffc;"
| 72 || March 21 || Philadelphia || 5–5 || Hartford || Myre || 14,460 || 45–9–18 || 108 || 
|- style="background:#fcf;"
| 73 || March 23 || Philadelphia || 2–7 || Boston || Peeters || 14,673 || 45–10–18 || 108 || 
|- style="background:#fcf;"
| 74 || March 25 || Philadelphia || 2–5 || NY Islanders || Myre || 14,995 || 45–11–18 || 108 || 
|- style="background:#cfc;"
| 75 || March 27 || Quebec || 2–5 || Philadelphia || Peeters || 17,077 || 46–11–18 || 110 || 
|- style="background:#ffc;"
| 76 || March 29 || Philadelphia || 3–3 || Washington || Myre || 18,130 || 46–11–19 || 111 || 
|- style="background:#cfc;"
| 77 || March 30 || Atlanta || 2–4 || Philadelphia || Peeters || 17,077 || 47–11–19 || 113 || 
|-

|- style="background:#ffc;"
| 78 || April 1 || Philadelphia || 3–3 || Quebec || Myre || 10,706 || 47–11–20 || 114 || 
|- style="background:#cfc;"
| 79 || April 3 || Washington || 2–4 || Philadelphia || Peeters || 17,077 || 48–11–20 || 116 || 
|- style="background:#fcf;"
| 80 || April 6 || NY Rangers || 8–3 || Philadelphia || Myre || 17,077 || 48–12–20 || 116 || 
|-

|-
| Legend:

Playoffs

|- align=center bgcolor="#ccffcc"
| 1 || April 8 || Edmonton || 3–4 || Philadelphia || OT || Peeters || 17,077 || Flyers lead 1–0 || 
|- style="background:#cfc;"
| 2 || April 9 || Edmonton || 1–5 || Philadelphia ||  || Peeters || 17,077  || Flyers lead 2–0 || 
|- style="background:#cfc;"
| 3 || April 11 || Philadelphia || 3–2 || Edmonton || OT || Myre || 15,423 || Flyers win 3–0 || 
|-

|- align=center bgcolor="#ccffcc"
| 1 || April 16 || NY Rangers || 1–2 || Philadelphia || || Peeters || 17,077 || Flyers lead 1–0 || 
|- style="background:#cfc;"
| 2 || April 17 || NY Rangers || 1–4 || Philadelphia || || Peeters || 17,077  || Flyers lead 2–0 || 
|- style="background:#cfc;"
| 3 || April 19 || Philadelphia || 3–0 || NY Rangers || || Peeters || 17,374 || Flyers lead 3–0 || 
|- style="background:#fcf;"
| 4 || April 20 || Philadelphia || 2–4 || NY Rangers || || Peeters || 17,368 || Flyers lead 3–1 || 
|- style="background:#cfc;"
| 5 || April 22 || NY Rangers || 1–3 || Philadelphia || || Peeters || 17,077 || Flyers win 4–1 || 
|-

|- style="background:#fcf;"
| 1 || April 29 || Minnesota || 6–5 || Philadelphia || || Peeters || 17,077 || North Stars lead 1–0 || 
|- style="background:#cfc;"
| 2 || May 1 || Minnesota || 0–7 || Philadelphia || || Myre || 17,077  || Series tied 1–1 || 
|- style="background:#cfc;"
| 3 || May 4 || Philadelphia || 5–3 || Minnesota || || Myre || 15,706 || Flyers lead 2–1 || 
|- style="background:#cfc;"
| 4 || May 6 || Philadelphia || 3–2 || Minnesota || || Myre || 15,650 || Flyers lead 3–1 || 
|- style="background:#cfc;"
| 5 || May 8 || Minnesota || 3–7 || Philadelphia || || Myre || 17,077 || Flyers win 4–1 || 
|-

|- style="background:#fcf;"
| 1 || May 13 || NY Islanders || 4–3 || Philadelphia || OT || Peeters || 17,077 || Islanders lead 1–0 || 
|- style="background:#cfc;"
| 2 || May 15 || NY Islanders || 3–8 || Philadelphia || || Peeters || 17,077  || Series tied 1–1 || 
|- style="background:#fcf;"
| 3 || May 17 || Philadelphia || 2–6 || NY Islanders || || Myre || 14,995 || Islanders lead 2–1 || 
|- style="background:#fcf;"
| 4 || May 19 || Philadelphia || 2–5 || NY Islanders || || Peeters || 14,995 || Islanders lead 3–1 || 
|- style="background:#cfc;"
| 5 || May 22 || NY Islanders || 3–6 || Philadelphia || || Peeters || 17,077 || Islanders lead 3–2 || 
|- style="background:#fcf;"
| 6 || May 24 || Philadelphia || 4–5 || NY Islanders || OT || Peeters || 14,995 || Islanders win 4–2 || 
|-

|-
| Legend:

Player statistics

Scoring
 Position abbreviations: C = Center; D = Defense; G = Goaltender; LW = Left Wing; RW = Right Wing
  = Joined team via a transaction (e.g., trade, waivers, signing) during the season. Stats reflect time with the Flyers only.
  = Left team via a transaction (e.g., trade, waivers, release) during the season. Stats reflect time with the Flyers only.

Goaltending

Awards and records

Awards

Records

The 1979–80 Philadelphia Flyers set the NHL record and North American pro sports record undefeated streak of 35 games, 25 wins and 10 ties, from October 14 to January 6. Likewise, they set team records for longest home undefeated streak at 26 games (October 11 to February 3) and longest road undefeated streak at 16 games (October 20 to January 6). Among other team records set during the regular season was the most powerplay goals allowed in a single game (6 on February 19) and the most penalties in a single game (38 on February 22). Their twelve losses and seven road losses on the season are the fewest in franchise history.

The Flyers set a number of franchise records during their semifinal playoff series with the Minnesota North Stars. On May 1, Bob Dailey tied a team record for most assists during a playoff game (4) and set the team record for points by a defenseman during a playoff game (5). Team records were also tied for most powerplay goals in a single game (4) and single period (3) during the same game. Bill Barber’s three shorthanded goals during the series is tied for an NHL record, as is the same total for most shorthanded goals in a playoff year.

Another series mark which tied the NHL record was the 15 powerplay goals allowed against the New York Islanders during the 1980 Stanley Cup Finals. Barber’s four game-winning goals is also tied for a team playoff year record and defenseman Andre Dupont’s +21 plus-minus rating is the team record. The Flyers nine home wins during the playoffs is tied for the most in team history.

Milestones

Transactions
The Flyers were involved in the following transactions from May 22, 1979, the day after the deciding game of the 1979 Stanley Cup Finals, through May 24, 1980, the day of the deciding game of the 1980 Stanley Cup Finals.

Trades

Players acquired

Players lost

Signings

Draft picks

Philadelphia's picks at the 1979 NHL Entry Draft, which was held at the Queen Elizabeth Hotel in Montreal, Quebec, on August 9, 1979.

Farm teams
The Flyers were affiliated with the Maine Mariners of the AHL, the Toledo Goaldiggers of the IHL, and the Hampton Aces of the Eastern Hockey League.

Notes

References
General
 
 
 
Specific

External links
 

Philadelphia Flyers seasons
Philadelphia
Philadelphia
Patrick Division champion seasons
Western Conference (NHL) championship seasons
Philadelphia Flyers
Philadelphia Flyers